= Khokariya, Bhopal =

Khokariya
- village
- Location within Madhya Pradesh Location within India
- Coordinates: 23.1967796°N 77.23959446°E
- Country: India
- State: Madhya Pradesh
- District: Bhopal
- Tehsil: Huzur
- Elevation: 515 m (1,690 ft)

Population (2011)
  - Total: 243
- Time zone: UTC+5:30 (IST)
- ISO 3166 code: MP-IN
- 2011 census code: 482490

Khokariya is a village in the Bhopal district of Madhya Pradesh, India. It is located in the Huzur tehsil and the Phanda block.

== Demographics ==
According to the 2011 census of India, Khokariya has 42 households. The effective literacy rate (i.e. the literacy rate of population excluding children aged 6 and below) is 79.82%.

Demographics (2011 Census)
| | Total | Male | Female |
|---|---|---|---|
| Population | 243 | 129 | 114 |
| Children aged below 6 years | 20 | 15 | 5 |
| Scheduled caste | 30 | 15 | 15 |
| Scheduled tribe | 0 | 0 | 0 |
| Literates | 178 | 106 | 72 |
| Workers (all) | 127 | 67 | 60 |
| Main workers (total) | 79 | 50 | 29 |
| Main workers: Cultivators | 42 | 40 | 2 |
| Main workers: Agricultural labourers | 29 | 4 | 25 |
| Main workers: Household industry workers | 5 | 3 | 2 |
| Main workers: Other | 3 | 3 | 0 |
| Marginal workers (total) | 48 | 17 | 31 |
| Marginal workers: Cultivators | 10 | 2 | 8 |
| Marginal workers: Agricultural labourers | 30 | 12 | 18 |
| Marginal workers: Household industry workers | 8 | 3 | 5 |
| Marginal workers: Others | 0 | 0 | 0 |
| Non-workers | 116 | 62 | 54 |
